Marcel Denis (31 January 1896 – 16 June 1953) was a French long-distance runner. He competed in the marathon at the 1928 Summer Olympics.

References

External links
 

1896 births
1953 deaths
Athletes (track and field) at the 1928 Summer Olympics
French male long-distance runners
French male marathon runners
Olympic athletes of France
Place of birth missing
20th-century French people